Ibrahim al Kashif (born 1915 in Wad Madani, Sudan, deceased in September 1969) was the most popular Sudanese singer between the end of World War II and the independence of Sudan in 1956. His innovative style developed out of Haqeebah Music, and he added a string section as well as other Western musical instruments to the traditional Sudanese percussion or Arabic oud. Because of these innovations and his choice of poetic or patriotic lyrics, he was later called the "Father of modern Singing in Sudan".

Musical style 
According to an article in Middle East Eye online magazine, Ibrahim al Kashif's song Write to Me Darling is set to the lyrics of the poem Letters, written by Sudanese poet Abed Abdel Rahman. After a long instrumental introduction of string instruments, percussion, oud and Western instruments like the flute, al Kashif sings about the narrator and his beloved, who had drifted apart:

Ongoing popularity of al Kashif's songs 
In 2018, Ibrahim al Kashif's song Elhabeeb ween (Where is my sweetheart?) was reissued on the CD compilation Two Niles to Sing a Melody: The Violins and Synths of Sudan.

During the Sudanese Revolution of 2018/19, his song Land of Good - I am African, I am Sudanese was played in the streets of Khartoum. On 11 April 2020, one year to the day after the Sudanese people filled the streets at the military headquarters in the heart of the capital Khartoum to celebrate the downfall of dictator Omar el Bashir, three Sudanese rap musicians published their remake of Ana Afriki, Ana Sudani (I'm African, I'm Sudanese), bearing witness to the ongoing popularity of el Kashif's patriotic song.

See also
Music of Sudan

References

External links 

 Write to Me, Darling ("حبيبي اكتب لي"), music video of historical radio recording by Ibrahim al Kashif, with English translation
 Land of Good (Ard al khayr), patriotic song about Africa by Ibrahim al Kashif,  with English translation

20th-century Sudanese male singers
1915 births
1969 deaths